A thermostad is a homogeneous layer of oceanic waters in terms of temperature, it is defined as a relative minimum of the vertical temperature gradient.

References

Oceanography